Stotfold is a town and civil parish in the Central Bedfordshire borough of Bedfordshire, England. The population at the 2011 census was 9,632. Stotfold is close to the county border with Hertfordshire.

Landmarks

Stotfold Watermill
Stotfold Watermill stands on the River Ivel and is one of four mills in Stotfold that were recorded in the Domesday Book.  It is the only working mill left in Stotfold and is a grade II listed watermill.  The Mill was fully restored after being burnt down on 15 December 1992.  The Mill opened to the public in May 2006 with the formal opening taking place October 2006 followed shortly after by a visit from the Duke of Edinburgh on 17 November 2006.  It has a 4.4 metre wide overshot corn mill waterwheel which is the widest in the country and is currently open to the public with a tea room on alternate weekends in season (March to October) and on special event weekends.  The Mill is a charity run by the Stotfold Mill Preservation Trust. All moneys raised are used for the continual upkeep and restoration of the Mill and of the local area.  Its major fundraiser is the annual Stotfold Mill Steam and Country Fair which takes place in May and attracted around 8,500 visitors raising approximately £20,000 in 2010.

St Mary's Church
The parish church of St Mary the Virgin dates to about 1150 but was probably preceded by a series of wooden Saxon churches on the same site. The church is built of flint with Ashwell clunch stone dressings to the buttresses and is mainly in the Early Perpendicular style. In about 1450 the tower was added and the chancel widened and it is believed that the baptismal font also dates from this time and is octagonal and panelled.

In about 1824 much work was done at the church which included plastering the roof of the north aisle and replacing both the mediaeval carvings and the 400 year-old pews, the latter being done by local contractor William Seymour of Arlesey. At the same time the old paintings on the walls were either destroyed or whitewashed over.

Sport and leisure

Stotfold has a Non-League football club Stotfold F.C., which plays at New Roker Park.

Famous residents

 Kevin Gentle (born 1959), former cricketer
 Nicky Hunt, Commonwealth Games Gold winner/Olympic hopeful (archery)
 Olympic and world champion track cyclist Victoria Pendleton was brought up in Stotfold.  In 2007, the cycle track between Arlesey and Stotfold was renamed in her honour.
 Craig Vye, actor, most recently seen in Hollyoaks playing Ethan Scott. Also seen in Aquila, London's Burning, Doctors and Skins.

References

External links 

Town Council

 
Towns in Bedfordshire
Civil parishes in Bedfordshire
Central Bedfordshire District